This is a list of Qawmi Madrasahs in Bangladesh.

Dhaka Division

Dhaka District 
 Islamic Research Center Bangladesh, Bashundhara, Dhaka
 Jamia Qurania Arabia Lalbagh, Dhaka
 Jamia Shari'ah Malibag, Dhaka
 Sheikh Zakariyyah Islamic Research Center, Dhak

Chittagong Division

Brahmanbaria District 
 Jamiah Islamiah Yunusia Brahmanbaria

Chittagong District 
 Al-Jamiah Al-Islamiah Obaidia Nanupur
 Al-Jamiah Al-Islamiah Patiya
 Al-Jamiatul Ahlia Darul Ulum Moinul Islam
Al Jameatul Arabia Lil Banina Wal Banat, Haildhar, Anwara
 Al-Jamiatul Islamiah Azizul Uloom Babunagar
 Al-Jamiatul Arabia Lil Baneena Wal Banaat Haildhar
 Jamia Darul Ma'arif Al-Islamia
 Jamiatul Uloom Al-Islamia Lalkhan Bazar

Chandpur District 
 Jamia Islamia Ibrahimia

Sylhet Division

Sylhet District 
 Jamia Tawakkulia Renga Madrasah
 Jamia Madania Angura Mohammadpur

Mymensingh Division

Mymensingh District 
 Jamia Mohammadia Tahfijul Quran Madrasa

References

Bibliography

 
Deobandi Islamic universities and colleges
Lists of Islamic universities and colleges
Bangladesh education-related lists
Deobandi-related lists